The  is a limited express train service operated by Hokkaido Railway Company (JR Hokkaido) between  and  in Hokkaido via the Hakodate Main Line since 4 March 2017. The Lilac train service name was also formerly used for express and limited express services operated by Japanese National Railways (JNR) and later by JR Hokkaido between 1963 and 2007.

Stations

Rolling stock
Services are normally formed of six-car 789 series electric multiple unit (EMU) trains. All cars are no-smoking.

Up until 2007, Lilac services were normally formed of 4-car 781 series EMUs based at Sapporo. All cars were non-reserved except for car 4.

History

1963-1968
This service was discontinued from 1 October 1968 when it was merged with the Niseko express.

1980-2007

Between Sapporo and New Chitose Airport, trains operated as the Airport rapid service. At the same time, the services to Mururan were split off to become the Suzuran limited express. The Lilac services supplemented the Super White Arrow services between Sapporo and Asahikawa, which stopped at fewer stations. The Lilac services operated hourly, departing from Sapporo and Asahikawa at 30 minutes past the hour, taking 1 hour 30 minutes.

Trains were repainted from the original JNR livery into a new livery based on that of the Super Tokachi between February 1992 and March 1993.

Improved "u-Seat" reserved seating accommodation (rows 1 to 7) was added to half of car 4 between March and June 2001.

Lilac services were discontinued from the start of the 1 October 2007 timetable revision, when they were merged and replaced together with the former Super White Arrow services to become Super Kamui services, and the 781 series EMUs were retired.

2017-

These services complement the Kamui services using five-car 789-1000 series EMUs.

References

Named passenger trains of Japan
Hokkaido Railway Company
Railway services introduced in 1963
Railway services introduced in 1980
Railway services introduced in 2017

ja:ライラック (列車)